San Marzano may refer to:

San Marzano tomato, Italian variety of tomatoes
San Marzano di San Giuseppe, Italian municipality in the Province of Taranto, Apulia
San Marzano Oliveto, Italian municipality in the Province of Asti, Piedmont
San Marzano sul Sarno, Italian municipality in the Province of Salerno, Campania